Sa'ad bin Ateeq bin Misfer Al Ateeq (Born 1969), is an Islamic preacher, religious scholar, thinker and university professor from Saudi Arabia. He is controversial for his religious sermon he delivered and his connection to governments of Arab states of the Persian Gulf, including the United Arab Emirates, Qatar and Saudi Arabia; particularly the Imam Muhammad ibn Abd al-Wahhab Mosque. The Foundation for Defense of Democracies, The Daily Beast, and Foreign Policy magazine have run articles about Al-Ateeq concerning his fanatic and fundamentalist hard line view. Foreign Policy has even compiled a large documentation of his government sponsored activities.

A Dhi al-Nurayn Mosque lecture by Al-Ateeq in 2005, was promoted by the Saudi Arabian government's official press agency.

In 2010, during the month of Ramadan, the Ministry of Awqaf and Islamic Affairs (Qatar) invited Sa'ad Ateeq al-Ateeq to give sermons. In May of 2011, the Ministry of Awqaf and Islamic Affairs (Qatar) once again invited Sa'ad Ateeq al-Ateeq to give sermons. One of his sermons is listed on the media section of the website of the Ministry of Awqaf and Islamic Affairs (Qatar).

The King Khalid Military College Mosque preacher and Imam is Sa'ad al-Ateeq. In December of 2010, he preached a sermon to the King Saud University students.

In a sermon at Qatar's Imam Muhammad ibn Abd al-Wahhab Mosque (Grand Mosque of Qatar) Sa'ad Ateeq called for the end of Jews and Christians by the hands of God and for Muslims and Islam to be exalted by God.

The Riyadh-based King Khalid Military College's Guidance Director is Sa'ad Ateeq al-Ateeq. He was invited to deliver a sermon to Qatari airport security on July 23, 2013 in Doha, Qatar by the Ministry of Interior. Al-Ateeq delivered a religious sermon to the Qatari Navy in July of 2013.

The Facilities Security Force of the Ministry of Interior (Saudi Arabia) hosted a lecture by Al-Ateeq on September 23, 2013.

On October 2, 2013, at the Imam Muhammad ibn Abd al-Wahhab Mosque, Sa'ad Ateeq al-Ateeq again called for their destruction of Christians and Jews and called for Muslims and Islam to be exalted.

In February of 2014, the Ministry of Awqaf and Islamic Affairs (Qatar) tweeted that the Imam Muhammad ibn Abd al-Wahhab Mosque was hosting another sermon by al-Ateeq.

In front of schoolchildren, Al-Ateeq delivered a lecture called (With beloved Muhammad) on Wednesday, February 26, 2014, in a Qur'an schools exhibition.

On July 6, 2014, al-Ateeq preached at the Imam Muhammad ibn Abd al-Wahhab Mosque. On July 9, 2014 al-Ateeq also gave another Ramadan sermon at the Imam Muhammad ibn Abd al-Wahhab Mosque. Al-Ateeq delivered a speech at the Dubai International Holy Quran Award which was set up by the Ruler of Dubai, Sheikh Mohammed bin Rashid Al Maktoum in July 2014. Al-Ateeq was named as one of the preachers and scholars in the event on the website of Sheikh Mohammed bin Rashid Al Maktoum He then delivered his speech at the event.

Sa'ad Ateeq al-Ateeq has called for the destruction of Shias, Christians, Nusayris (Alawites), and Jews and called  for Muslims and Islam to be exalted in Qatar's Imam Muhammad ibn Abd al-Wahhab Mosque in January of 2015. This was advertised on the website of the Ministry of Awqaf and Islamic Affairs (Qatar) and on the official Twitter account of the Ministry of Awqaf and Islamic Affairs (Qatar) His January 2015 sermon in the Imam Muhammad ibn Abd al-Wahhab Mosque was advertised by al-Ateeq on his Twitter.

In Sudan, in March 2015, al-Ateeq again called for the destruction of who he called "Rafidah" Shia, "Nusayri" (Alawites), Christians, and Jews and called for Muslims and Islam to be exalted.

King Khaled Mosque hosted a speech by al-Ateeq It was advertised by the official Twitter account of the Mosque.

References

External links

Living people
1969 births
Imam Muhammad ibn Saud Islamic University alumni
Saudi Arabian Islamic religious leaders
Sunni imams
Saudi Arabian Sunni Muslim scholars of Islam
Saudi Arabian Salafis
Saudi Arabian imams
20th-century imams
21st-century imams
Critics of Shia Islam